Sečovlje Saltpans Natural Park is a natural park in southwestern Slovenia covering the Sečovlje Saltpans near the village of Sečovlje.

Visitors provide an important source of income for the park. Due to its specific geographic constraints and other factors, (and especially in order to encourage visitors to leave their vehicles outside the park boundaries) it is hoped that electric 'game watching vehicles' (electric public transport) for visitors can be introduced.

References

External links
 

 
Landscape parks in Slovenia
Municipality of Piran
Istria